Pelecinobaccha is a genus of hoverfly in the Neotropical region, formerly included in the genus Ocyptamus, which was split after researchers determined it was not monophyletic.

Species
P. alicia (Curran, 1941)
P. beatricea (Hull, 1942)
P. clarapex (Wiedemann, 1830)
P. concinna (Williston, 1891)
P. cora (Curran, 1941)
P. costata (Say, 1829)
P. cryptica (Hull, 1942)
P. dracula (Hull, 1943)
P. eruptova (Hull, 1943)
P. hiantha (Hull, 1943)
P. hirundella (Hull, 1944)
P. ida (Curran, 1941)
P. mexicana (Curran, 1930)
P. peruviana Shannon, 1927
P. pilipes (Schiner, 1868)
P. telescopica (Curran, 1930)
P. transatlantica (Schiner, 1868)
P. tristis (Hull, 1930)

References

Diptera of South America
Diptera of North America
Hoverfly genera
Syrphini